Schwyz railway station is a railway station in the municipality of Schwyz, the capital of the canton of Schwyz in Switzerland.  Opened in 1882, it is owned and operated by the Swiss Federal Railways, and forms part of the Gotthard railway, which links northern Switzerland and Immensee with Chiasso and Italy, via the Gotthard Tunnel.

History
Schwyz railway station was opened in 1882, as the Gotthardbahn began operations. When the Gotthardbahn was nationalised in 1909, the station came into the ownership of the SBB-CFF-FFS.

In 1900, the Schwyzer Strassenbahnen electric tramway opened their first line, from the station to the Schwyz Post stop in the town centre. In 1914 and 1915, the line was extended through the town centre to Brunnen railway station and the Brunnen ferry terminal. The line closed in 1963, and was replaced by bus services.

In 1979 and 1980, the entire station was redeveloped.  The station building was demolished and replaced with the present, post-modern buildings. Also, the platform system was renewed, and the sidings removed.

Facilities
The railway facilities at the station include four through tracks, three of which face a railway platform. However, only the middle platform facing tracks 2 (towards Brunnen) and 3 (towards Steinen/Arth-Goldau) is used for scheduled passenger trains.  Track 1, facing the main platform, and track 4, which has no platform, are used for overtaking trains.

There are also still some sidings and connecting tracks, mainly for the Schwyzerland cheese factory, KIBAG, Arthur Weber Stahl and Zeughausareal Seewen.

Services 
 the following services stop at Schwyz:

Bus traffic 
The bus station is next to the station building and has three bus platforms. Several bus routes operated by the Auto AG Schwyz company link the station with the Schwyz town centre in about five minutes:

 Line 1: Lauerz – Schwyz – Muotathal
 Line 3: Seewen – Ibach – Schwyz – Rickenbach

See also

History of rail transport in Switzerland
Rail transport in Switzerland

References

Bibliography

External links

 

Railway stations in the canton of Schwyz
Swiss Federal Railways stations
Schwyz
Railway stations in Switzerland opened in 1882